The 1959 European Amateur Boxing Championships  were held in Lucerne, Switzerland from May 24 to May 31. The 13th edition of the bi-annual competition was organised by the European governing body for amateur boxing, EABA. There were 180 fighters from 25 countries participating.

Medal winners

Medal table

External links
Results
EABA Boxing
Amateur Boxing

European Amateur Boxing Championships
Boxing
European Amateur Boxing Championships
Boxing
Sport in Lucerne
European Amateur Boxing Championships
European Amateur Boxing Championships